Mark Davidovich Lubotsky, Russian: Марк Давыдович Лубоцкий (May 18, 1931 – March 13, 2021) was a Russian violinist, music teacher, writer, and memoirist.

Biography
Born in Leningrad, the son of surgeon David Naumovich Lubotsky (1899-1967), Lubotsky began violin studies at age 7, in 1938, at the Moscow Central Music School.  He continued his music studies at the Moscow Conservatory, where his teachers included Abram Yampolsky and David Oistrakh.  In 1951, Lubotsky was a prize winner at the Weltjugendfestspielen ('World Youth Festival') in Berlin.  He later became a teacher at the Gnesin Institute in Moscow.

Lubotsky emigrated to The Netherlands in 1976, where he taught at the Sweelinck Conservatorium in Amsterdam and the Rotterdam Conservatory.  He later settled in Germany, where he taught at the Hochschule für Musik und Theater Hamburg.  Lubotsky was a champion of the music of Alfred Schnittke, who dedicated several of his works to Lubotsky.

His marriage to Olga Dowbusch-Lubotsky produced two sons, Alexander Markovich Lubotsky and David Markovich Lubotskysky.  Lubotsky died in Hamburg.

References

External links
 Elizabeth Wilson, "For the love of Mark Lubotsky", 16 March 2021

Russian violinists
1931 births
2021 deaths